Cails Mills is a community in Weldford Parish, New Brunswick, located 4.26 km ENE of Bryants Corner and 3.83 km W of Fords Mills.

History

Cails Mills had a Post Office from 1912–1964 with Jonathan Cail as first postmaster. The community was named for the family of Anthony Cail who had a mill near the mouth of the Coal Branch River and were among the earliest settlers of the community to arrive from England.

Notable people

See also
List of communities in New Brunswick

References

Settlements in New Brunswick
Communities in Kings County, New Brunswick